The China Governess is a crime novel by Margery Allingham, first published in 1963, in the United Kingdom by Chatto & Windus, London. It is the seventeenth novel in the Albert Campion series.

Plot introduction
Timothy Kinnit is trying to elope with Julia, but the question of his origins as a wartime refugee baby stand between them and their future. What does the "Turk Street Mile", once the wickedest street in London but now redeveloped after wartime bombing, have to do with the mystery? Can Albert Campion and the recently widowed Superintendent Charles Luke find the answer and discover who wants it kept a secret?

References 

 Margery Allingham, The China Governess, (London: Chatto & Windus, 1963)

External links 
An Allingham bibliography, with dates and publishers, from the UK Margery Allingham Society
 A page about the book from the Margery Allingham Archive

1963 British novels
Novels by Margery Allingham
Chatto & Windus books